The Two-man bobsleigh competition at the 1998 Winter Olympics in Nagano was held on 14 and 15 February, at Spiral. Huber lead Lueders by 0.05 seconds after the first run. Leuders picked up 0.02 seconds in the next two runs. Prior to the start of the fourth run, Lueders turned to Huber and asked "Can you imagine if we tied this thing?" After the fourth run, Tartaglia stated "In the end, it felt like were friends who had accomplished something together."

Results

References

External links
Wallechinsky, David and Jaime Loucky (1998). "Bobsleigh: Two-Man". In The Complete Book of the Winter Olympics: 2010 Edition. London: Aurum Press Limited. pp. 159–60.

Bobsleigh at the 1998 Winter Olympics